Stefan Đorđević may refer to:

Basketball 
Stefan Đorđević (basketball, born 1989), Serbian basketball player (Crvena zvezda, Greece, Montenegro, Poland, Radnički Kragujevac)
Stefan Đorđević (basketball, born 1998), Serbian basketball player (Vršac, FMP)

Football 
Stefan Đorđević (footballer, born 1990), Montenegrin association football forward
Stefan Đorđević (footballer, born 1991), Serbian association football defender
Stefan Đorđević (footballer, born 1994), Serbian association football goalkeeper